Levar Depree Fisher (born July 2, 1979) is a former American football linebacker in the National Football League. He was with the Arizona Cardinals (2002–2004) and in the off-season of 2005 the New Orleans Saints. He played college football at North Carolina State University.

High school career
Fisher attended East Carteret High School in Beaufort, North Carolina, where he was a three-year letterman in football. As a senior, he rushed for 1043 yards on offense, and on defense, made 147 tackles (14 for losses).

College career
A four-year starter for the Wolfpack, Fisher was the ACC's Defensive Player of the Year in 2000 and a first-team All-ACC selection in 2000 and 2001. He finished his career with 492 tackles, 12 sacks and 9 fumbles caused.  In 2000, he led the nation in tackles per game with 15.1. He was a 2001 Sports Illustrated first-team All-American LB, with Rocky Calmus and E. J. Henderson.

NFL career
Drafted by the Arizona Cardinals in the 2002 NFL Draft, Fisher's career was short lived because of knee problems. He was later signed by the New Orleans Saints and left the NFL in 2005.

Motivational speaker
Fisher currently works as a motivational speaker. He wrote the book Hold On to Your Dreams, published in 2011.

References

1979 births
Living people
Players of American football from North Carolina
American football linebackers
NC State Wolfpack football players
Arizona Cardinals players
New Orleans Saints players
People from Morehead City, North Carolina